Hm Nai (Mandarin: Wunai (唔奈 Wúnài), Cantonese: Ng-nai) is a Hmong-Mien language (Chinese: Miao-Yao 苗瑶) spoken in western Hunan province, China. There are approximately 5800 people speaking this language, and the number is decreasing. Mao & Li (1997) determined it to be closely related to the Pa-Hng language.

References

Bibliography

 
 

Hmongic languages
Languages of China